Askar Chingizovich Aitmatov (born January 5, 1959, in Frunze, Kirghiz SSR, Soviet Union) served as Foreign Minister in the Government of Kyrgyzstan from June 2002 to March 2005. He is the son of the late Kyrgyz writer Chinghiz Aitmatov. Graduated from the Institute of Asian and African Countries at Moscow State University (1981) with a degree in Oriental History. Fluent in English, Turkish, French.

References

External links
AITMATOV, Askar Chingizovich International Who's Who. accessed September 1, 2006.

1959 births
Living people
People from Bishkek
Government ministers of Kyrgyzstan
Foreign ministers of Kyrgyzstan